Kajiwara is a Japanese surname. Notable people with the surname include:

, Japanese samurai
, Japanese writer
, Japanese samurai
, Japanese samurai
, Japanese Paralympic swimmer
, Japanese Go player
 Takuma Kajiwara (ca. 1877-1960), American artist and photographer
, Japanese musician
, Japanese actor

Japanese-language surnames